Brother Jekwu is a 2016 Nigerian comedy thriller film directed by Charles Uwagbai, written and produced by Mike Ezuruonye. It was released across Cinemas in 2016.

Plot 
Chasing wild success, a village hustler follows his cousin from Nigeria to Kenya and stumbles into the shady business affairs of a notorious overlord.

Cast

References

External links 

 
 

Nigerian comedy films
Films set in Lagos
Films shot in Lagos
2019 comedy films
English-language Nigerian films
Nigerian comedy-drama films